The Travellers Rest is a public house at Alpraham, near Tarporley, in Cheshire, England.

It is on the Campaign for Real Ale's National Inventory of Historic Pub Interiors.

It was built in about 1850 and extended in 1937, and the interwar interior remains largely unchanged.

This pub has been in the same family since 1900. It has a bowling green which opened in 1921. 

It used to have a café (opened early 1950s, closed 1989) which catered for coach traffic, mainly in the summer. It was used by Barton Transport of Nottingham as the refreshment halt on their Nottingham to Llandudno express coach service.

References

Buildings and structures in Cheshire
National Inventory Pubs